Bemposta Dam is a concrete arch dam on the Douro, where the river forms the national border line between Spain and Portugal. It is located in the municipality Mogadouro, in Bragança District, Portugal.

Construction of the dam began in 1957. The dam was completed in 1964. It is owned by Companhia Portuguesa de Produção de Electricidade (CPPE).

Dam
The volume of the dam is 316,000 m³. The dam contains four crest spillways (maximum discharge 11,500 m³/s) and one bottom outlet (maximum discharge 200 m³/s).

Reservoir
At full reservoir level of 402 metres the reservoir of the dam has a surface area of 4.05 km2 and its total capacity is 129 mio. m³ (active capacity 20 mio. m³).

Power plant 
The power plant is a run-of-the-river hydroelectric power station. It is owned by CPPE, but operated by EDP.

Bemposta I
Bemposta I has a nameplate capacity of 240 (210)MW.  Its average annual generation is 924.1 (918, 1,034 or 1,086) GWh.

The power station contains three Francis turbine-generators with 79.5 (70) MW each in an underground powerhouse. The turbine rotation is 150 rpm. The minimum hydraulic head is 59 m, the maximum 71 m. Maximum flow per turbine is 152 m³/s.

Bemposta II
In January 2008 construction began on the Bemposta II power plant. In December 2011 work on an additional underground powerhouse was completed and a further Francis turbine with a 191 MW capacity went online. Its average annual generation is 134 GWh.

See also

 List of power stations in Portugal

References

Dams in Portugal
Hydroelectric power stations in Portugal
Arch dams
Dams completed in 1964
Energy infrastructure completed in 1964
1964 establishments in Portugal
Buildings and structures in Bragança District
Underground power stations
Dams on the Douro River
Portugal–Spain border